The Roman Catholic Archdiocese of Burgos is one of Spain's Latin Metropolitan sees.

Its ecclesiastical province includes four suffragan bishoprics: 
 Bilbao
 Osma–Soria
 Palencia
 Vitoria

Extent and flock  
The archdiocese comprises since the Concordat of 1851 almost the entire Burgos province. 
By 2006, the number of parishes had declined to 1001.

In 2006, the Archdiocese of Burgos had 339,360 Catholics.  This meant that 94% of the population was Catholic in the area. However, since the Catholic Church records people who have been baptized as members, and only with the rare occurrence of excommunication are people normally removed from the records, this figure probably includes many people who not only do not attend Catholic services but may have actually been baptized in and currently attending Protestant, Latter-day Saint or Muslim services.

The diocese had 589 Catholics per priest, which although it was higher than the 439 Catholics per priest that there had been in 1978 it was much lower than the 655 Catholics per priest in the Diocese back in 1950.

Geography 
The northern and eastern portion of the diocese is mountainous, thickly wooded, and traversed by rivers, among which is the Ebro, which rises in the mountains and serves as the eastern boundary for Miranda de Ebro. The Arlanza which crosses the diocese from east to west flows by Salas de los Infantes, near the famous monastery of Santo Domingo de Silos, and through the center of the well-known town of Lerma.

The mountainous region is unproductive of cereals, but fruits grow in abundance, and fine pasture-lands sustain great herds of cows and sheep, which furnish excellent meat and milk. Delicate cheeses which take their name from the city and are famous throughout Spain, are made in this section. Minerals are abundant, especially sulphate of soda, common salt, iron, and hard coal. The southern part of the diocese, especially the valley and plains, is fertile and produces abundantly vegetables, cereals, and quite a quantity of wind. The climate, cold but healthy, is damp towards the north. Although this section has few industries, the transportation of its fruit and minerals is greatly facilitated by the numerous highways and by the railroad between Madrid and France which crosses the eastern side of the diocese from south to north. There are also some secondary railway lines for the operation of the mines.

History 
Burgos has been since 800 AD an episcopal see of Spain, into which in the 1087 the territory of the suppressed Roman Catholic Diocese of Valpuesta (a suffragan of the primatial Metropolitan of Tarragona; later the titular see of Valliposita) was merged.
 
In 1574 Pope Gregory XIII raised it to metropolitan rank, at the request of King Philip II of Spain.

Councils in Burgos 
Some important councils have been held in Burgos. A national council took place there in 1078, although opinions differ as to date (the "Boletín de la Academia de la Historia de Madrid", 1906, XLIX, 337, says 1080). This was presided over by the papal delegate, Cardinal Roberto, and attended by King Alfonso VI of Castile. It was convoked for the purpose of introducing into Spain the Roman Rite form of liturgy with the Roman Breviary and Sacramentary, in place of the Mozarabic Rite then in use (which now survives only in Toledo).

Another national council, presided over by Cardinal Boso (d. 1181), also papal delegate, settled questions of discipline and established diocesan rights and limits. The proceedings of this council remained unpublished until quite recently, when they were made known in the Boletín already mentioned (XLVIII) 395).

In 1898, a provincial council was called by Archbishop (not Cardinal) Don Gregorio Aguirre, in which the obligations of the clergy and the faithful were most minutely set forth.

(Archi)Episcopal incumbents

Bishops of Burgos (1075–1574)
 1075–1082 : Simeón (or Simón)
 1082–1096 : Gómez
 1097–1114 : García Aznárez
 1114–1118 : Pascual
 1119–1146 : Ramiro (intruso)
 1147–1156 : Víctor
 1156–1181 : Pedro Pérez
 1181–1200 : Marino Maté
 1200–1205 : Mateo I
 1206–1211 : García Martínez de Contreras
 1211–1212 : Juan Maté
 1213–1238 : Mauricio
 1240–1246 : Juan Domínguez de Medina, Died
 1246–1257 : Aparicio
 1257–1259 : Mateo II Rinal
 1260–1267 : Martín González
 1268–1269 : Juan de Villahoz, Died
 1275–1280 : Gonzalo Pérez Gudiel, Appointed, Archbishop of Toledo; future Cardinal
 1280–1299 : Fernando Covarrubias, Died
 1300–1302 : Pedro Rodríguez, Appointed, Cardinal-Bishop of Sabina
 1303–1313 : Pedro Rodríguez Quijada?
 1313–1327 : Gonzalo Osorio Villalobos
 1327–1348 : García de Torres Sotoscueva
 1348–13 . . : Pedro
 1351–13 . . : Lope de Fontecha
 1352–13 . . : Juan Sánchez de las Roelas
 1361–13 . . : Juan
 1362–1365 : Fernando de Vargas
 1366–1380 : Domingo de Arroyuelo
 1381–1382 : Juan García Manrique
 1382–1394 : Gonzalo Mena Roelas, Appointed, Archbishop of Sevilla
 1394–1406 : Juan de Villacreces
 1407–1413 : Juan Cabeza de Vaca.
 1413–1414 : Alfonso de Illescas
 1415–1435 : Pablo de Santa María
 1435–1456 : Alfonso de Cartagena
 1456–1495 : Luis de Acuña y Osorio
 1495–1512 : Pascual Rebenga de Ampudia, Died — (or 1496–1512)
 1512–1514 : (Cardinal) Jaime Serra i Cau, Appointed, Administrator of Calahorra y La Calzada
 15 . .–1514 : Ortega Gomiel
 1514–1524 : Juan Rodríguez de Fonseca, Died
 1525–1527 : Antonio de Rojas Manrique, Died
 1529–1537 : Íñigo López de Mendoza y Zúñiga, Died (Cardinal in 1531)
 1537–1550 : Juan Álvarez de Toledo, Appointed, Archbishop of Santiago de Compostela) (Cardinal in 1538)
 1550–1566 : (Cardinal) Francisco Mendoza de Bobadilla, Died
 1567–1574 : (Cardinal) Francisco Pacheco de Toledo; see below

Archbishops of Burgos (from 1574) 

In 1574, the see of Burgos was raised to the status of an archbishopric by Pope Gregory XIII.
 1574–1579 : (Cardinal) Francisco Pacheco de Toledo, Died; see above
 1580–1599 : Cristóbal Vela Tavera, Died
 1600–1604 : Antonio Zapata y Cisneros, Resigned (elevated to Cardinal in 1605)
 1604–1612 : Alfonso Manrique, Died
 1613–1629 : Fernando de Acevedo González, Died
 1630–1631 : José González Díez, (José González de Villalobos) Died
 1631–1640 : Fernando Andrade Sotomayor, Appointed Archbishop (Personal Title) of Sigüenza
 1640–1655 : Francisco de Manso Zuñiga y Sola, Died
 . . . . .1657 : Juan Pérez Delgado
 1658–1663 : Antonio Payno Osorio, Appointed, Archbishop of Seville
 1663–1664 : Diego de Tejada y la Guardia
 1665–1679 : Enrique de Peralta y Cárdenas
 1680–1701 : Juan de Isla
 . . . . .1702 : (Cardinal) Francisco Antonio de Borja-Centelles y Ponce de Léon
 1703–1704 : Fernando Manuel de Mejía
 1705–1723 : Manuel Francisco Navarrete
 1724–1728 : Lucas Conejero de Molina
 1728–1741 : Manuel de Samaniego y Jaca
 1741–1744 : Diego Felipe de Perea y Magdaleno
 1744–1750 : Pedro de la Cuadra y Achica
 1751–1757 : Juan Francisco Guillén Isso
 1757–1761 : Onésimo de Salamanca y Zaldívar
 1761–1764 : Francisco Díaz Santos del Bullón
 1764–1791 : José Javier Rodríguez de Arellano
 1791–1797 : Juan Antonio de los Tucros
 1797–1801 : Ramón José de Arce
 1801 : Juan Antonio López Cabrejas (electo)
 1802–1822 : Manuel Cid y Monroy
 1824 : Rafael de Vélez, OFM Cap, Appointed, Archbishop of Santiago de Compostela
 1825–1829 : Alonso Cañedo Vigil
 1830–1832 : Joaquín López y Sicilia, Appointed, Archbishop of Valencia
 1832–1840 : Ignacio Rives y Mayor
 1845–1847 : Severo Leonardo Andriani y Escofet (Administrador Apostólico)
 1847–1848 : Ramón Montero
 1849–1857 : Cirilo Alameda y Brea, OFM Obs, Appointed, Archbishop of Toledo (Cardinal in 1858)
 1857–1867 : Fernando de la Puente y Primo de Rivera (Cardinal in 1862)
 1867–1882 : Anastasio Rodrigo Yusto
 1883–1886 : Saturnino Fernández de Castro y de la Cotera
 1886–1893 : Manuel Gómez Salazar y Lucio Villegas
 1894–1909 : Gregorio Maria Aguirre y Garcia, OFM Disc (Cardinal in 1907)
 1909–1912 : Benito Murúa López
 1913–1918 : José Cadena y Eleta
 1919–1926 : Juan Benlloch i Vivó (Cardinal in 1921)
 1926–1927 : Pedro Segura y Sáenz, Appointed, Archbishop of Toledo (Cardinal in 1927)
 1928–1944 : Manuel de Castro Alonso
 1944–1963 : Luciano Pérez Platero — (or 1945–1963)
 1964–1983 : Segundo García de la Sierra y Méndez (o Segundo García de Sierra y Méndez)
 1983–1992 : Teodoro Cardenal Fernández
 1992–2002 : Santiago Martínez Acebes
 2002–2015 : Francisco Gil Hellín
 2015–2020 : Fidel Herráez Vegas
  : Mario Iceta Gavicagogeascoa

Auxiliary bishops
1568–1579 : Gonzalo Herrera Olivares, Died
1605–1610 : Alonso Orozco Enriquez de Armendáriz Castellanos y Toledo, Appointed, Bishop of Santiago de Cuba
1648–1669 : Pedro Luis Manso Zuñiga, Died

Saints 
Saint Julian, Bishop of Cuenca, called the Almoner because of his great charity to the poor, was born in Burgos; also Saint Amaro the Pilgrim, who has always had a special cult devoted to him in Burgos, though not found in the Roman Martyrology. Two local saints were the martyrs Centola and (H)Elen(s).

Saint Iñigo (Enecus or Ignatius), abbot of Oña, while not born in Burgos, labored there for many years; also Saint Domingo de Silos, abbot and reformer of the famous monastery of Silos, and Saint John of Sahagún, a native of that town in the Province of León.

Among its saints may also be mentioned the martyrs of Cardeña, religious of the convent of the same name, who in the tenth century were executed by the Arab soldiers of the Emir of Córdoba in one of their numerous invasions of Castile; and St. Casilda, daughter of a Moorish king of Toledo, converted near Burgos whither she had gone with her father's consent to drink the water of some medicinal springs. She built a hermitage and died a saintly death.

See also
 Timeline of Burgos

References 

Roman Catholic dioceses in Spain
Dioceses established in the 10th century